Utikuma Lake is a large lake in north-central Alberta, Canada.

It is drained by the Utikuma River and then Wabasca River to Peace River.

The name Uticuma is Cree for "big whitefish".

The Utikoomak Lake 155 indian reserve of the Whitefish Lake First Nations is established on the northern shore.

See also
Lakes of Alberta

References

Big Lakes County
Lakes of Alberta
Northern Sunrise County